The 2007 WAC men's basketball tournament  was March 6–10 in the Pan American Center in Las Cruces, New Mexico.  The winners of the tournament were the second-seeded New Mexico State Aggies, the host team.  Regular season champion #10 Nevada was upset in the semifinals by Utah State.

In the NCAA tournament, New Mexico State was seeded #13 in the East region and lost in the first round; Nevada was the #7 seed in the South region and advanced to the second round.

Fresno State and Utah State made the National Invitation Tournament (NIT), but both lost road games in the first round.

Bracket

References

WAC men's basketball tournament
Tournament
WAC men's basketball tournament
WAC men's basketball tournament